Grattachecca is a cold street food originating in Rome, Italy. Commonly sold in kiosks and bars, it consists of hand-shaved ice flavoured with various flavours of sweet sciroppo. In contemporary times, some grattachecca vendors use a mechanical ice crusher, rather than shaving or grating the ice by hand. Some vendors believe that using a machine is more hygienic compared to hand shaving the ice.

Alla fonte d'oro
The kiosk Alla fonte d'oro is the oldest in the city, and has served Romans and tourists since 1913. The kiosk uses machine-grated ice, rather than grating it by hand.

Gallery

See also
Shaved ice § Regions, for similar shaved ice variations around the world.
Kakigōri: Japanese shaved ice
Bingsu: Korean shaved ice
 Tshuah-ping: Taiwanese shaved ice
Halo-halo: Filipino shaved ice (derived from Japanese Kakigori)
Es campur and Es teler: Indonesian shaved ice
Namkhaeng sai and O-aew: Thai shaved ice
Ais Kacang (ABC): Malaysian shaved ice
Hawaiian shave ice: Hawaiian shaved ice

References

Cuisine of Lazio
Ice-based desserts
Street food in Italy